Carlo Cattaneo (15 June 1801 – 6 February 1869) was an Italian philosopher, writer, and activist, famous for his role in the Five Days of Milan in March 1848, when he led the city council during the rebellion.

Early life

Cattaneo was born in Milan on 15 June 1801. He was the son of Melchiorre Cattaneo, a goldsmith, and Maria Antonia Sangiorgi. After attending school in Milan he studied law at the University of Pavia, graduating in 1824.  A republican in his convictions, during his youth Cattaneo had taken part in the Carbonari movement in Lombardy. He devoted himself to the study of philosophy, with the hope of regenerating Italian people by withdrawing them from romanticism and rhetoric, and turning their attention to the positive sciences. In this period, Cattaneo met philosopher Giandomenico Romagnosi and he "was especially attracted by Romagnosi's emphasis on practical solutions and interdisciplinary work". Developing some intuitions coming from his mentor, Cattaneo expounded his ideas in a review founded by him in Milan in 1839, called Il Politecnico. He resided at the Palazzo Gavazzi from 1840 until 1848.

1848 revolution
When the revolution of 1848 broke out, Cattaneo became one of the leaders of the insurrection against the Austrians, known as the Five Days of Milan (18–22 March 1848). Together with the young democrats Enrico Cernuschi, Giulio Terzaghi and Giorgio Clerici he formed a council of war which, having its headquarters at Palazzo Taverna in via Bigli, directed the operations of the insurgents. When on March 18 Field Marshal Radetzky, feeling that the position of the Austrian garrison was untenable, sounded the rebels as to their terms, some of the leaders were inclined to agree to an armistice which would give time for the Piedmontese troops to arrive (Piedmont had just declared war), but Cattaneo insisted on the complete evacuation of Lombardy. Again, on 21 March, Radetzky tried to obtain an armistice, and Durini and Borromeo were ready to grant it, for it would have enabled them to reorganize the defences and replenish the supplies of food and ammunition, which could only last another day. However, Cattaneo replied:

The enemy having furnished us with munitions thus far, will continue to do so. Twenty-four hours of victuals and twenty-four hours of hunger will be many more hours than we shall need. This evening, if the plans we have just arranged should succeed, the line of the bastions will be broken. At any rate, even though we should lack bread, it is better to die of hunger than on the gallows.

On the expulsion of the Austrians the question arose as to the future government of Milan and Italy. Cattaneo was an uncompromising republican and a federalist; so violent was his dislike of the Piedmontese monarchy that when he heard that King Charles Albert had been defeated by the Austrians, and that Radetzky was marching back to reoccupy Milan, he exclaimed:

Good news, the Piedmontese have been beaten. Now we shall be our own masters; we shall fight a people's war, we shall chase the Austrians out of Italy, and set up a Federal Republic.

Exile and later career

When the Austrians returned, in August 1848, Cattaneo fled Milan and took refuge in the canton of Ticino, Switzerland. In 1852 he became a professor of philosophy at the new lyceum of Lugano, where he taught until 1865, and played a decisive role in defining the institution's pedagogy. He wrote his Storia della Rivoluzione del 1848 (History of the 1848 Revolution), the Archivio triennale delle cose d'Italia (3 vols., 1850–1855), then, early in 1860, he started publishing the Politecnico once more. In 1858, the Grand Council of Ticino awarded Cattaneo an honorary bourgeoisie.

Whiled exiled in Switzerland, Cattaneo continued to follow the events of Italian unification. He strongly opposed the Camillo Benso di Cavour for his unitarian views and for the cession of Nice and Savoy to France in the Treaty of Turin. In 1860, Giuseppe Garibaldi summoned him to Naples to take part in the government of the Neapolitan provinces, but he would not agree to the union with Piedmont without local autonomy. After the establishment of the Kingdom of Italy he was frequently asked to stand for the Chamber of Deputies, but always refused because he could not conscientiously take the oath of allegiance to the monarchy. In 1868 the pressure of friends overcame his resistance, and he agreed to stand, but at the last moment he drew back, still unable to take the oath, and returned to Switzerland. He died on 6 February 1869 in Castagnola, near Lugano.

As a writer, Cattaneo was learned and brilliant, but some view him as being too bitter a partisan to be judicious, owing to his narrowly republican views; his ideas on local autonomy were wise, but, at a moment when unity was regarded as an absolute requisite, they were deemed inopportune. Gaetano Salvemini considered him one of 19th-century Italy's men of genius along with Giacomo Leopardi, Camillo Benso di Cavour, and Francesco de Sanctis.

Works

 Interdizioni israelitiche, essay from the year 1836
La città considerata come principio ideale delle istorie italiane
Dell'India antica e moderna
Notizie naturali e civili su la Lombardia
Vita di Dante di Cesare Balbo
Dell'Insurrezione di Milano nel 1848 e della successiva guerra

See also
 Jessie White Mario

References

Further reading
Norberto Bobbio, Una filosofia militante: studi su Carlo Cattaneo, Einaudi, Torino 1971.

1801 births
1869 deaths
Writers from Milan
Italian republicans
Italian revolutionaries
19th-century Italian philosophers
Italian people of the Italian unification
Critics of the Catholic Church
Burials at the Cimitero Monumentale di Milano
Exiled Italian politicians
Italian magazine founders
People of the Revolutions of 1848
Italian expatriates in Switzerland
University of Pavia alumni